Heroes in the Healing of the Nation is the second collaborative studio album by Zion I and The Grouch. It was released by Z & G Music on March 22, 2011. It is the follow-up to their 2006 collaborative album, Heroes in the City of Dope. It features guest appearances from Fashawn, Casual, and Freeway, among others. It peaked at number 13 on the Billboard Heatseekers Albums chart, number 47 on the Independent Albums chart, number 48 on the Top R&B/Hip-Hop Albums chart, and number 23 on the Top Rap Albums chart.

Critical reception

Edwin Ortiz of HipHopDX commented that the album "invokes a general ambience of positivity that you'll rarely find these days." Meanwhile, Will Georgi of Okayplayer said, "[the] sanctimonious vibe just makes me feel like a difficult teenager and want to do anything but listen to Zion I & The Grouch."

Track listing

Personnel
Credits adapted from liner notes.

 Zumbi (Zion I) – vocals
 Amp Live (Zion I) – production (except 12)
 The Grouch – vocals, production (8)
 Brother Ali – vocals (1)
 Gawain Mathews – guitar (1, 5, 14)
 Rio Amor – vocals (2)
 Kosi Warrn House – vocals (2)
 Tenshi Lucasey – vocals (2)
 Taariq Saffouri – vocals (2)
 Jesse Krebs – djembe (2)
 Headnodic – bass guitar (3, 10)
 Kev Choice – piano (3), keyboards (8)
 Freeway – vocals (3)
 The R.O.D. Project – vocals (3)
 D.U.S.T. – vocals (4)
 Jenny Jenn – vocals (4)
 Jacob Hemphill – vocals (5)
 Crystal Monee Hall – vocals (3, 5, 7, 10)
 Marcus Paul James – vocals (3, 7)
 Justin Johnston – vocals (3, 7)
 Mike Olmos – trumpet (5)
 DJ Platurn – turntables (6)
 Del the Funky Homosapien – vocals (6)
 Silk E – vocals (7)
 K.Flay – vocals (7)
 Mac Arthur – vocals (7)
 Adam Theis – horns (7)
 Roy Ayers – vocals (8)
 Lincoln Adler – saxophone (8)
 Tom Young – guitar (9)
 Codany Holiday – vocals (10, 11)
 Joy King – vocals (10)
 Malik Shabazz – vocals (10)
 Carl Wheeler – organ (11)
 Fashawn – vocals (11)
 Casual – vocals (11)
 Marty James – vocals (12)
 Eligh – production (12)
 Mystic – vocals (13)
 Eric Rachmany – vocals (13), guitar (13), keyboards (13)
 Joe Cohen – saxophone (13)
 Rafael Rodriguez – horns (13)
 Hellman Escorcia – horns (13) 
 Mitchell "Jet Man" Wilcox – drums (13)
 Los Rakas – vocals (14)
 Jesse Krebs – drum interlude
 Ben Yonas – additional recording
 Alejandro Llinas – additional recording assistance
 Jason Moss – mixing
 Justin Weis – mastering
 Courtney Duvendack – layout, design
 Arian Stevens – photography

Charts

References

External links
 
 

2011 albums
Zion I albums
The Grouch (rapper) albums
Albums produced by Eligh